Pritam Vithal Gandhe (born 6 August 1971, in Nagpur) is a former Indian first-class cricketer. He debuted in 1987–88 and was a right-arm offbreak bowler, with over 300 wickets for Vidarbha to his name. He was the captain of the Vidarbha Ranji Trophy team. He retired from first-class cricket on 30 June 2009, after being in the sport for 21 years.

External links
 
 

1971 births
Living people
Vidarbha cricketers
Indian cricketers
Central Zone cricketers
20th-century Indian people